The Nguyễn Văn Trỗi–Trần Thị Lý Bridge is a cable-stayed bridge crossing the Hàn River connects Hai Chau district, Son Tra district, Ngu Hanh Son district in the city of Đà Nẵng, Vietnam. The new bridge replaces two older bridges named after Nguyễn Văn Trỗi and Trần Thị Lý.

This is a cable-stayed bridge with a total length is 731 metres, total height is 145 metres.

History 
At this location, more than 60 years ago, the French Indochina built the first bridge in Da Nang and they call it De Lattre bridge. Then, in 1955, this bridge has a new name: Trinh Minh The Bridge (Trinh Minh The is a general of the army of Vietnam Republic). After 1975, It was renamed Tran Thi Ly bridge. Because the bridge is old so the government decided to rebuild the new bridge. This bridge started to build in April 2009 with the total investment being 497.7 billion VND. After 4 years, this bridge was open on March 29, 2013.

References

Road bridges in Vietnam
Bridges in Da Nang
Bridges completed in 2013